WLVF (930 AM) was a radio station broadcasting a Southern Gospel format. Licensed to Haines City, Florida, United States, the station was owned by Landmark Baptist Church. During its final years, the station served as a simulcast of its sister station, WLVF-FM, which is still broadcasting the Gospel in central Florida.

History
The station went on the air as WHAN on September 9, 1960. It then became WFXI on February 9, 1979. On July 23, 1984, the station changed its call sign to WTHN; on March 26, 1986, the station changed to WLVF. WLVF went silent August 30, 2010 after losing its transmitter site; after determining that there were no sites available to return the station to the air, Landmark Baptist Church turned in the license for WLVF on May 18, 2011. The license was cancelled on June 7, 2011.

References

External links
 Query the FCC's AM station database for WLVF

LVF
Radio stations established in 1960
Radio stations disestablished in 2011
Defunct radio stations in the United States
1960 establishments in Florida
2011 disestablishments in Florida
Defunct religious radio stations in the United States
LVF